In the Life is the fifth studio album by Japanese rock duo B'z. The album debuted with 1,043,070 copies sold and 2,402,970 copies in total.

This album features a harder sound than its predecessors. Although synthesizers are still a large part of the band's sound, Tak's guitar starts to gain more presence.

Only one single was released, the power ballad "Alone."

Track listing

Certifications

External links 
 B'z albums at the official site

1991 albums
B'z albums
Japanese-language albums